Władysław Gzel (born 29 August 1942) is a Polish footballer. He played in two matches for the Poland national football team from 1962 to 1964.

References

External links
 
 

1942 births
Living people
Polish footballers
Poland international footballers
Place of birth missing (living people)
Association football forwards